TVX may refer to:

 TVX Broadcast Group, a defunct American media company
 Television X, a series of adult television channels in the UK
 TVX, a Salvadoran broadcasting through Channel 23.
 Thermal expansion valve